Mathijs Desmet (born 28 January 2000) is a Belgian professional volleyball player. He is a member of the Belgium national team. At the professional club level, he plays for Kioene Padova.

Honours

Clubs
 National championships
 2017/2018  Belgian Cup, with Knack Roeselare
 2018/2019  Belgian SuperCup, with Knack Roeselare
 2018/2019  Belgian Cup, with Knack Roeselare
 2019/2020  Belgian SuperCup, with Knack Roeselare
 2019/2020  Belgian Cup, with Knack Roeselare
 2020/2021  Belgian Cup, with Knack Roeselare
 2020/2021  Belgian Championship, with Knack Roeselare
 2021/2022  Belgian Championship, with Knack Roeselare

References

External links
 
 Player profile at LegaVolley.it  
 Player profile at Volleybox.net

2000 births
Living people
People from Roeselare
Sportspeople from West Flanders
Belgian men's volleyball players
Belgian expatriate sportspeople in Italy
Expatriate volleyball players in Italy
Outside hitters